Simon Hirsch (born 3 April 1992) is a German male volleyball player. He is part of the Germany men's national volleyball team. On club level he plays for Gi Group Monza.

Sporting achievements

National team
 2017  European Championship

References

External links
Profile at FIVB.org

1992 births
Living people
German men's volleyball players
Sportspeople from Ulm
German expatriates in Italy
Expatriate volleyball players in Italy